Cavan Gaels is a Gaelic Athletic Association club from Cavan Town, County Cavan in Ireland. They are affiliated to Cavan GAA. The club was founded in 1957 following the merging of 2 clubs in Cavan Town, Cavan Harps and Cavan Slashers. They are the second most successful team in Cavan GAA history. They have 14 Senior Championship titles, the most recent being in 2017 when they beat Castlerahan on a score line of 0-13 to 0-08. Cavan Gaels appeared in 16 of the 20 Cavan Senior Football Championship finals between 1998 and 2017 winning 10.

History

The club was founded in 1957 in Cavan Town, County Cavan, Ireland after the merging of 2 clubs in the town, Cavan Slashers and Cavan Harps. The name Cavan Gaels was first suggested by Hugh Doonan the late father of the 2003 Cavan Senior Football Championship winning captain James Doonan. A year after their foundation they lost the Cavan Senior Football Championship to Crosserlough 3-07 to 3-04. They won their first Cavan Senior Football Championship in 1965 beating Baileborough Celtic. They lost their next two finals both to Crosserlough in 1968 and 1972. In 1975 they regained the Oliver Plunkett cup beating rivals Crosserlough, they won it again in 1977 & 81 beating St. Mary's and Ballyhaise, their last for 23 years. They lost the 1984 final to Laragh United, the 1997 final to Mullahoran and the 2001 final to Gowna 2-10 to 0-11. The new millennium was the dawn of a new era for the Gaels as they appeared in every final from 2000 to 2011. They won 8 Cavan Senior Football Championship winning two trebles (2003-2005 and 2007-2009). After defeat to Gowna in 2000 they won the following year beating Gowna 0-18 to 0-07. In 2002 they lost again to Gowna. In 2003, 2004 and 2005 they beat Mullahoran before being beaten by Mullahoran in 2006. In 2007 the Gaels beat Gowna 0-12 to 0-11, the first of another treble. In 2008 and 2009 they beat Denn GFC 0-12 to 0-11 and 1-10 to 1-11. They lost to Kingscourt Stars in 2010 1-10 to 1-09 but regained the title in 2011 beating Castlerahan 1-14 to 1-12. Their largest winning margin in a Cavan Senior Football Championship final. Their astonishing run of consecutive final appearances was ended in 2012 when they were beaten in the quarter final stages by Killygarry. An unfancied Ballinagh GAA side pipped the Gaels to the 2013 Cavan Senior Football Championship, before finally regaining the Championship against Kingscourt Stars in what can only be described as a titanic struggle in 2014. They hold an unrivaled success record to the envy of every other senior club in Cavan.
They were favourites for the 2018 championship even after a narrow loss to local rivals Killygarry.

Club crest
The club crest came into existence in 1984 when all clubs in the country were asked as part of the G.A.A.’s Centenary year to design their own club crest. Central to the crest is the Fransciscan Abbey, an important landmark in Cavan Town and the interlocking of the letters H and S which illustrate the merging of the two existing town clubs, Cavan Harps and Cavan Slashers into one town club, Cavan Gaels in 1957.

Notable people
Current Gaels players on the senior Cavan county team include Martin Dunne, Barry Fortune, Luke Fortune, Paul Graham, Seánie Johnston, Micheál Lyng, Niall Murray and Stephen Murray. Former player and club member Micheal Graham managed the senior county team to a Tailteann Cup final. Former players include Dr Cathal Collins, James Doonan, Anthony Forde, Johnny Graham, Paul Kinsella, Jim McDonnell, Shane McGlade, Charlie Noonan, Eamon Reilly, Colin Sheridan, Jimmy Sheridan and Nicolas Walsh. Brian Crowe, who refereed the 2006 All-Ireland SFC final, is also a club member.

Achievements
 Cavan Senior Football Championship: 14
 1965, 1975, 1977, 1978, 2001, 2003, 2004, 2005, 2007, 2008, 2009, 2011, 2014, 2017
 Cavan Senior Hurling Championship: 5
 1973, 1974, 1983, 1984 & 1985
 Cavan Intermediate Football Championship: 1
 1976
 Cavan Under-21 Football Championship: 5
 2000, 2001, 2004, 2012 & 2016
 Cavan Minor Football Championship: 17
 1967, 1968, 1978, 1987, 1991, 1998, 1999, 2000, 2001, 2002, 2003, 2004, 2006, 2007, 2008, 2010 & 2018

References

External links
Cavan Gaels Official Website
Official Cavan GAA Website
Cavan Club GAA

Gaelic games clubs in County Cavan
Gaelic football clubs in County Cavan
Hurling clubs in County Cavan